Elisha Muroiwa (born 28 January 1989) is a Zimbabwean international footballer who plays for Mufulira Wanderers as a right back.

Career
Muroiwa has played for Harare Sporting, Highfield United and Dynamos.

He made his international debut in 2016, and was named in the squad for the 2017 Africa Cup of Nations.

References

External links

1989 births
Living people
Zimbabwean footballers
Zimbabwean expatriate footballers
Zimbabwe international footballers
Dynamos F.C. players
Singida United F.C. players
Mufulira Wanderers F.C. players
Association football fullbacks
2017 Africa Cup of Nations players
People from Harare
Zimbabwean expatriate sportspeople in Tanzania
Zimbabwean expatriate sportspeople in Zambia
Expatriate footballers in Tanzania
Expatriate footballers in Zambia
Tanzanian Premier League players
Zimbabwe A' international footballers
2016 African Nations Championship players